The Marlborough Highway is a minor highway in Tasmania. It links the Lyell Highway to the Lake Highway and cuts short the otherwise very long journey from the West Coast to the Central Highlands.

The road leaves the Lyell Highway near Bronte Park and travels overland to Miena, on the Great Lake. There are no settlements along its route.

The road is unsealed, and in times of heavy snow it cannot be passed.

See also

 Highways in Australia
 List of highways in Tasmania

References

Highways in Tasmania
Central Highlands (Tasmania)